Lord Cullen may refer to:

 Francis Grant, Lord Cullen (died 1726/1663–1726), Scottish judge, Solicitor General for Scotland and Lord of Session
 Robert Cullen, Lord Cullen (1742–1810), Scottish judge, Lord of Session from 1796, involved in founding the Royal Society of Edinburgh
 William James Cullen, Lord Cullen (1859–1941), Scottish judge, Senator of the College of Justice from 1909
 Brien Cokayne, 1st Baron Cullen of Ashbourne (1864–1932), British businessman and banker
 William Cullen, Baron Cullen of Whitekirk (born 1935), Scottish judge; Lord Justice General and Lord President of the Court of Session, additional Lord of Appeal in the House of Lords

See also 
 William Cullen (disambiguation)